Scottish Cant (often called Scots-Romani or Scotch-Romani) is a cant spoken in Scotland by Lowland Scottish Romani Travellers.

Classification
It is uncertain whether Scottish Cant is the result of Scottish Lowland Romani Travellers transitioning from speaking Romani to speaking a mixed language (like what happened to Romanichal Travellers in England with Angloromani and Romanisæl Travellers in Sweden and Norway with Scandoromani), or whether it is the result of Romani in Lowland Scotland merging with an indigenous Lowland Traveller group.

Up to 50% of Scottish Cant originates from Romani-derived lexicon. This is because the Scottish Lowland Travellers come from traditionally itinerant groups of Romani heritage.

Lowland Scottish Travellers/Gypsies are not to be confused with indigenous Highland Travellers, an entirely indigenous group of travelling people with their own distinct language.

Like Angloromani and Scandoromani, Scottish Cant is considered a Para-Romani language.

The Scottish Gaelic element in the dialects of Scottish Cant is put anywhere between 0.8% and 20%.

Use of archaic Scots

Gaelic influences
Loans from Gaelic include words like:
 "bad" (Gaelic  "old")

Romani influences
The percentage of Romani lexical vocabulary is said to be up to 50% of the lexicon; some examples are:
 "man" (Romani  "a non-Romani person")
 "water" (Romani )

Recordings 
Hamish Henderson and other folklorists recorded various conversations about the Scottish Cant language, with speakers including Lizzie Higgins and Jeannie Robertson. He also recorded Belle Stewart singing a version of "Dance to Your Daddy" in both Cant and Scots.

See also
 Angloromani language
 Beurla Reagaird
 Shelta

References

 
Languages of Ireland
Languages of Scotland
Anglic languages
Romani in Scotland
Mixed languages